Brett Blewitt, (born 17 November 1975) is an Australian actor who played Brett Stark on the Australian soap opera Neighbours from 1993 to 1996. Brett briefly returned to the show in 2005, when his character made a cameo appearance.

Prior to appearing in Neighbours, Brett starred in the Gary Reilly created Australian Sitcom My Two Wives alongside Kym Valentine who would be his co-star several years later on Neighbours.

Since leaving Neighbours, Brett has worked as a guest on television shows and starred alongside the Olsen twins in Our Lips Are Sealed. Brett has been writing for production companies and is in collaboration writing with former co-star Jesse Spencer in Los Angeles.

More recently Brett has started an enterprise showing off his home city of Sydney.
 Great Race is a fun Sydney day tour.

Career
 GP (TV series) ABC
 My Two Wives
 Home and Away
 Neighbours
 Our Lips Are Sealed

References

1976 births
Living people
Australian male soap opera actors
Australian male child actors